Giosuè Stefano Ligios (26 December 1928 – 9 December 2021) was an Italian politician. A member of the Christian Democracy party, he served in the Senate of the Republic from 1972 to 1983 and in the European Parliament from 1979 to 1989.

References

1928 births
2021 deaths
People from the Province of Nuoro
Christian Democracy (Italy) politicians
Senators of Legislature VI of Italy
Senators of Legislature VII of Italy
Senators of Legislature VIII of Italy
MEPs for Italy 1979–1984
MEPs for Italy 1984–1989